Zornia dyctiocarpa is a prostrate or decumbent perennial plant to 30 cm tall. The specific epithet dyctiocarpa is derived from the Greek language, and refers to the significantly veined pods. A  widespread plant, found in grassland and open forest.

References

dyctiocarpa
Flora of New South Wales
Flora of Queensland
Flora of the Northern Territory
Plants described in 1811